Theodore Athelbert Daniels III (born 1944 in Ancon, Panama) is a Panamanian prelate who served as Bishop of the Virgin Islands from 1997 to 2003.

Biography
Daniels graduated from Florida State University and the Episcopal Theological Seminary of the Caribbean in San Juan, Puerto Rico. He served as assistant of Christ Church in Colón, Panama and St Christopher's Church in Panama City. He was also priest-in-charge of five missions. After arriving in the US in 1980, he became rector of St Luke's Church in Columbia, South Carolina, while in 1986 he became rector of the Church of the Holy Redeemer in Landover Hills, Maryland. In 1992 he moved to Washington D.C. and became rector of Calvary Church.

On March 12, 1997 he was elected Bishop of the Virgin Islands and was consecrated on June 30, 1997 by Walter Dennis, Suffragan Bishop of New York. He retired in 2003.

References 
After Long Wait, Virgin Islands Elects Bishop

Living people
1944 births
Episcopal bishops of the Virgin Islands
People from Panamá District
Panamanian Anglicans
Florida State University alumni